Pausa-Mühltroff is a town in the Vogtlandkreis district in Saxony, Germany, created with effect from 1 January 2013 by the merger of the towns of Pausa and Mühltroff.

References 

Towns in Saxony
Vogtlandkreis